Aeroport is a rural locality (a selo), and one of four settlements in Borogonsky 2-y Rural Okrug of Oymyakonsky District in the Sakha Republic, Russia, in addition to Tomtor, the administrative center of the Rural Okrug, Agayakan and Kuydusun. Its population as of the 2002 Census was 61.

The Oymyakon Airport, that gives the village its name, was built during the Second World War as part of the ALSIB route for transferring Lend-Lease aircraft from the United States to the Soviet Union. It has an unpaved runway of 1900 metres length. In 1961, a cargo flight from Yakutsk to Oymyakon crashed en route, with no survivors. In the 1990s, Oymyakon had scheduled flights operated by Sakha Avia but these no longer operate. The disused terminal building was still standing as of 2018, however.

References

Notes

Sources
Official website of the Sakha Republic. Registry of the Administrative-Territorial Divisions of the Sakha Republic. Oymyakonsky District. 

Rural localities in Oymyakonsky District